Huidu is a Romanian surname. Notable people with the surname include:

Florin Huidu (born 1976), Romanian sprint canoeist
Șerban Huidu (born 1976), Romanian radio and television personality

Romanian-language surnames